Jalchak is a  village in the Pingla CD block in the Kharagpur subdivision of the Paschim Medinipur district in the state of West Bengal, India.

Geography

Location

Area overview
Kharagpur subdivision, shown partly in the map alongside, mostly has alluvial soils, except in two CD blocks in the west – Kharagpur I and Keshiary, which mostly have lateritic soils. Around 74% of the total cultivated area is cropped more than once. With a density of population of 787 per km2nearly half of the district's population resides in this subdivision. 14.33% of the population lives in urban areas and 86.67% lives in the rural areas.

Note: The map alongside presents some of the notable locations in the subdivision. All places marked in the map are linked in the larger full screen map.

Demographics
According to the 2011 Census of India, Jalchak had a total population of 6,793, of which 3,620 (53%) were males and 3,173 (47%) were females. There were 825 persons in the age range of 0–6 years. The total number of literate persons in Jalchak was 5,049 (84.60% of the population over 6 years).

Education
Jalchak Nateswari Netaji Vidyayatan is a Bengali-medium co-educational institution established in 1949. The school has facilities for teaching from class V to class XII. It has a library with 4,000 books, 10 computers and a playground.

Culture
David J. McCutchion mentions the Ramchandra temple of Bhattacharya family as a pancha ratna having rekha turrets with curved cornices and porch on three arches, richly terracotta decorated, built in 1817, measuring 18’ 2” square.

Jalchak picture gallery

Healthcare
There is a primary health centre at Jalchak, with 10 beds.

References

External links

Villages in Paschim Medinipur district